Royal College of Arts, Science, Commerce and Management,  popularly known as Royal College, is a college located in Mira Road, Mumbai, Maharashtra and is affiliated to University of Mumbai. It is the only major higher education institute in Mira-Bhayandar. N. L. Dalmia Institute of Management Studies and Research and N. L. Dalmia High School are situated just opposite to it. The college was rated "A with 3.10 CGPA" by the National Assessment and Accreditation Council (NAAC).

Royal College is a part of the Royal Society, which was founded on 28 December 1966 by Prof. Asgar E. Lakdawala. It has minority quota for Muslim students. The college offers undergraduate courses in Arts, Science, Commerce and Management Studies. It also offers masters in advanced accountancy (Mcom).

Parwaaz - The Royal Flight - Annual Magazine of the College
Parwaaz is the annual college magazine, efforts towards publication of which mainly come from the English Literary Association. The magazine includes prize-winning articles in English, Hindi and Urdu languages by students from the competitions that are held within that year. It also includes a record of all faculties, students and their academic performance, results of GyanManthan, and the last page describes the 'Best Outgoing Student of the Year'. Prof. A. E. Lakdawala heads the Editorial committee of the magazine which consists of faculty members from each literary club and students with excellent performance and contribution towards these clubs.

Royal Alumni
Royal College Alumni Association was established in August 1993. Every year, the Alumni have a reunion on the first Sunday after 26 January in the college premises. Bollywood film director Anurag Basu is probably the most famous alumni of this college.

References

Education in Mira-Bhayandar
Universities and colleges in Maharashtra
Affiliates of the University of Mumbai